Soft computing is a set of algorithms, 
including neural networks, fuzzy logic, and evolutionary algorithms.
These algorithms are tolerant of imprecision, uncertainty, partial truth and approximation.
It is contrasted with hard computing: algorithms which find provably correct and optimal solutions to problems. 


History 
The theory and techniques related to soft computing were first introduced in 1980s. The term "soft computing" was coined by Lotfi A. Zadeh.

See also 
 Emergence
 Synthetic intelligence
 Watson (computer)

Notable journals 

 Soft Computing
Applied Soft Computing

References

Soft computing